Zenón Franco Ocampos (born 12 May 1956, Paraguay) is a chess grandmaster (GM) from Paraguay. In the 1982 Chess Olympiad at Lucerne, he won the gold medal at board one by scoring 11 of 13. In the 1990 Chess Olympiad at Novi Sad, he shared first place at board one with 9 points in 12 games. , Ocampos is the top-ranked player and only GM in Paraguay (now, there are three GMs: Zenon Franco, Axel Bachmann and Jose Cubas). He has written several books on chess for Gambit Publications under the name Zenon Franco.

Books

Notes

References
25th Chess Olympiad: Lucerne 1982 at Olimpbase.org

External links

1956 births
Chess grandmasters
Paraguayan chess players
Living people
Chess Olympiad competitors